Hypnale zara, the lowlands hump-nosed pit viper, is a venomous pitviper species endemic to Sri Lanka. It is distinguished from Hypnale nepa by variably colored body and less upcurved snout. No subspecies are currently recognized.

Description

Hypnale zara has 10-19 minute scales from wart-like protuberance on the snout tip. 18-39 heterogeneous small scales on inter nasal to prefrontal region can be seen, along with six scales around the eye, and seven to eight. supralabials. Costal scales are keeled. Ventrals are 134–157 in number. Subcaudals may be 34–51.

Dorsum color ranges from yellowish brown to dark brown, sometimes deep red. Two rows of distinct sub-oval or sub-triangular blotches meet on vertebral region. There is a dark stripe across eye and cheek. Venter is lighter than dorsum, sometimes light ash-gray.

Reproduction
Hypnale zara is ovoviviparous.

References

zara
Reptiles of Sri Lanka
Reptiles described in 1849
Taxa named by John Edward Gray